Nikola Katic (born June 1, 1986 in Makarska) is a former Croatian footballer who currently is the assistant head coach for Pittsburgh Riverhounds SC in the USL.

Career

College
Katic came to the United States from his native Croatia in 2005 to attend Illinois Central College, where he majored in marketing and was a two year starter and captain. In 2006, he was honored as an NJCAA All American after he scored five goals and had eight assists.

In 2007, he transferred to Western Illinois University, where he was selected to the Comfort Inn & Suites All-Tournament Team, and was named the team’s newcomer of the year. In 2008, Katic was named to the Country Inn Green Bay Nike Soccer Classic All Tournament team. He was also selected to the All-Summit League Second Team, named to the All-Summit league All-Tournament Team and to the NSCAA/Adidas All-Midwest Region Team.

During his college years Katic also played in the USL Premier Development League with both Chicago Fire Premier and Springfield Demize.

Professional
Katic turned professional in 2009 when he signed with the Pittsburgh Riverhounds upon their return to the USL Second Division. He made his professional debut on May 30, 2009 in a 3-1 win over the Wilmington Hammerheads.

References

External links
Riverhounds bio
Western Illinois bio

1986 births
Living people
People from Makarska
Association football defenders
Croatian footballers
Western Illinois Leathernecks men's soccer players
Chicago Fire U-23 players
Springfield Demize players
Pittsburgh Riverhounds SC players
USL League Two players
USL Second Division players
USL Championship players
Croatian expatriate footballers
Expatriate soccer players in the United States
Croatian expatriate sportspeople in the United States
Croatian football managers
Pittsburgh Riverhounds SC coaches
Croatian expatriate football managers
Expatriate soccer managers in the United States